Datian Min ( or  'Datian speech') is a Southern Min language spoken in Datian County, Sanming City, Fujian Province, China. It has been influenced by other Min languages, including Central Min, Eastern Min, Northern Min and Puxian Min.

Datian Min developed from Hokkien, a dialect of Southern Min. Before the year 1535, this area belonged to four counties: Youxi, Dehua, Yong'an and Zhangping. Hokkien was spoken in Dehua and Zhangping, while Yong'an and Youxi spoke Central Min and Eastern Min respectively. Datian County was set up and affiliated to Yanping Fu (延平府, modern Nanping) which spoke Northern Min in 1535. Language contact occurred in the later days. The county changed affiliate to Yongchun Zhou (永春州, modern Yongchun County, spoke Hokkien dialect) in 1734, then to Yong'an Division (永安专区, modern Sanming Prefecture, spoke Central Min) in 1949. The administrative here changed so frequently that the differences between Datian Min and Hokkien dialect became more and more obvious.

Datian Min has little intelligibility with other varieties of Southern Min, and is sometimes classified as a separate branch of Min. Some Chinese scholars call it Min dialects transition area.

References

Southern Min
Languages of China